Mangelia perpulchra is a minute extinct species of sea snail, a marine gastropod mollusk in the family Mangeliidae.

Description
The length of the shell attains 11 mm.

Distribution
This extinct marine species was found in the Middle Miocene strata of Hungary and Serbia

References

  Wood, Searles Valentine. A Monograph of the Crag Mollusca: With Descriptipns of Shells from the Upper Tertiaries of the British Isles. Vol. 1. Johnson, 1848

External links
 Worldwide Mollusc Species Data Base: Mangelia gardnerae

perpulchra
Gastropods described in 1848